Queer Island is an island in Kodiak Island Borough, Alaska, in the United States. 

The name is derived from a translation of the Russian "Ostrov Chudnoy".

References

Islands of Kodiak Island Borough, Alaska
Islands of Alaska